Karen B. Coolman (born August 26, 1947) is an American politician. She served as a Democratic member for the 86th district of the Florida House of Representatives.

Life and career 
Coolman was born in Norfolk, Virginia. She attended Michigan State University.

In 1974, Coolman was elected to represent the 86th district of the Florida House of Representatives, succeeding Jon C. Thomas. She served until 1976, when she was succeeded by Linda C. Cox.

References 

1947 births
Living people
Politicians from Norfolk, Virginia
Democratic Party members of the Florida House of Representatives
20th-century American politicians
20th-century American women politicians
20th-century American women
21st-century American women
Women state legislators in Florida
Michigan State University alumni